Emre Korkmaz (born 19 June 1986, in Istanbul) is a Turkish actor.

Biography
Emre Korkmaz started at acting in theatre at the age of 16. Korkmaz graduated in Tourism and Hotel Management from Kocaeli University and Business Management from Eskisehir Anatolian University. Korkmaz who had begun studying acting at the Şahika Tekand acting studio (The Studio Players). He began working at Hadi Çaman's Yeditepe Theatre. He continues to work under with Theatre Lir.

Filmography

Television 
 Muhteşem Yüzyıl Kösem : Mert Baykal - (Sipahi) - 2016
 Paramparça : Deniz Çelebi - (Kenan Şimşir) - 2016
 Evli ve Öfkeli : Nisan Akman - (Harun) - 2015
 Cin Kuyusu : Murat Toktamışoğlu - (Cemil) - 2015
 Deliha : Hakan Algül - (Barmen) - 2014
 Kızıl Elma : Raşit Çelikezer - (Nedim) - 2014
 Vicdan : Feride Kaytan - (Mustafa) - 2013
 Osmanlı Tokadı : Hakan Gürtop - 2013
 Evlilik Okulu : Uğur Yağcıoğlu - (Fikri) - 2013
 İbreti Ailem : Ömer Uğur - (Taksici) - 2012
 At Tutulması : Feride Kaytan - 2011
 Sakarya Fırat : Emre Kabakuşak - (Hamit) - 2011
 Karakol : Onur Tan - (Altan Yetişir) - 2011
 Öyle Bir Geçer Zaman ki : Zeynep Günay Tan - 2011
 Yerden Yüksek : Taner Akvardar - (Tren Osman) - 2010
 Umut Yolcuları : Ümmü Burhan - (Haydar) - 2010
 Küçük Sırlar : Kerem Çakıroğlu - (Sertan) - 2010
 Kanıt : Cem Sürücü - (İsmail) - 2010
 Akasya Durağı : Yaşar Seriner - (Bekir) - 2010 - 2011
 Arka Sokaklar : Orhan Oğuz - (Uzay/Ercan/Reşit) - 2008 - 2010 - 2012
 Kollama : Cem Akyoldaş - (Selman Gündüz) - 2009
 Ölümsüz Kahramanlar : Fatih Derin - (Alper Güvlü/Sinan Demirbaş) - 2008 - 2009
 HG : (Kenan Kara) - 2008
 Hatırla Sevgili : Ümmü Burhan - (Cihan Alptekin) - 2008
 Kurtlar Vadisi Terör : Sadullah Şentürk (Alper) - 2007
 Uğursuz Para : - (Cem) - 2006

Short films and documentaries 
 Bir Adam Yaratmak (short film) - 2014
 Geçmişin Gölgesi (short film) - 2013
 Fitnat (short film) : Irmak Delan -  2011
 Ve Merhaba Kainat: Nazım Hikmet (documentary) : Şükran Bircan - (Kendisi) - 2009
 Olasılıklar Üzerine (short Film) : Melike Şansal - 2009
 Çip (short Film) : Arif Yıldırdı - 2006
 Braun Silk Epil (commercial) - (Series)

Theatre 
 Guluk Guluk (Şarkıcı Yunus Tako) - Tiyatro Lir
 Bahar Şenliği - Tiyatro Lir
 Kahraman Köpek Çiço - Tiyatro Lir
 Yalnız Aslan Liyuva - Tiyatro Lir
 Can Dostum : Hadi Çaman - Hadi Çaman Yeditepe Theatre
 Çekirge Bir Sıçrar : İdil Yazgan İdil Yazgan (Moda D.K Theatre)
 Venedik Taciri (The Merchant of Venice) : William Shakespeare
 Narkoperasyon : Bileşke Theatre
 Kadınlık Bizde Kalsın : Yılmaz Erdoğan - Kocaeli MYO
 Benim Adım Elektrik : - İlkay Eser Theatre
 Karar&Çıkış : Performance show Acting Studio (Studio Oyuncuları)

References

External links
 Emre Korkmaz at the imdb.com

1986 births
Living people
Turkish male film actors
Turkish male stage actors
Turkish male television actors